An odontogenic infection is an infection that originates within a tooth or in the closely surrounding tissues. The term is derived from odonto- (Ancient Greek: ,  – 'tooth') and -genic (Ancient Greek: , ;  – 'birth'). The most common causes for odontogenic infection to be established are dental caries, deep fillings, failed root canal treatments, periodontal disease, and pericoronitis. Odontogenic infection starts as localised infection and may remain localised to the region where it started, or spread into adjacent or distant areas.

It is estimated that 90-95% of all orofacial infections originate from the teeth or their supporting structures and are the most common infections in the oral and maxilofacial region. Odontogenic infections can be severe if not treated and are associated with mortality rate of 10 to 40%. Furthermore, about 70% of odontogenic infections occur as periapical inflammation, i.e. acute periapical periodontitis or a periapical abscess. The next most common form of odontogenic infection is the periodontal abscess. 


Odontogenic sinusitis
Sinusitis is inflammation of the paranasal air sinuses. Odontogenic sinusitis is an inflammatory condition of the paranasal sinuses that is the result of dental pathology, most often resulting from prior dentoalveolar procedures, infections of maxillary dentition, or maxillary dental trauma. Infections associated with teeth may be responsible for approximately 20% of cases of maxillary sinusitis. The cause of this situation is usually a periapical or periodontal infection of a maxillary posterior tooth, where the inflammatory exudate has eroded through the bone superiorly to drain into the maxillary sinus. Medical management and treatment of the underlying dental pathology remains a critical initial step in the treatment of odontogenic sinusitis, however recent literature suggests that a significant portion of patients may require endoscopic sinus surgery for successful disease resolution. Once an odontogenic infection involves the maxillary sinus, it is possible that it may then spread to the orbit or to the ethmoid sinus.

Complications of Odontogenic Infection 
Odontogenic infection can be managed relatively easily if treated in the early stages of infection. However, there are some factors which need to be taken in consideration when dealing with odontogenic infection. Major complication factor for managing odontogenic infections is host defence mechanism which can be impaired by systemic illnesses and certain medications. Table below shows most common causes for impaired defence mechanism.

If treatment is delayed, odontogenic infection can spread into adjacent tissues consequently leading to life-threatening conditions. Most commonly resulting in respiratory obstruction and sepsis, and less commonly endocarditis, necrotising fasciitis, spondylitis, brain abscess, descending mediastinitis, thoracic empyema, pleuropulmonary suppuration, aspiration pneumonia, pneumothorax, mandibular or cervical osteomyelitis, abscess of the carotid sheath and jugular thrombophlebitis, hematogenous dissemination to distant organs, and coagulation abnormalities.

References

Diseases of oral cavity, salivary glands and jaws
Dentistry